The 2017 Ligas Departamentales, the fifth division of Peruvian football (soccer), was played by variable number teams by Departament.

Liga Departamental de Amazonas

First stage

Group A

Group B

Group C

Group D

Second stage 
Source:

Liga Departamental de Áncash

Liga Departamental de Apurímac

First stage 
Santiago Apóstol and Defensor Uripa from the Chincheros District received a bye to the second round.

Second stage

Final stage

Liga Departamental de Arequipa

First stage

Group G

Second stage

Final stage

Liga Departamental de Ayacucho

Liga Departamental de Cajamarca

Liga Departamental del Callao

First stage

Group A

Group B

Group C

Group D

Second stage 
No final game was played. The team with the greatest goal difference during the semifinals was declared the Departmental champion.

Liga Departamental de Cusco

First stage

Group A

Group 1

Play off 

Corazón Chequeño advanced to the Second stage.

Group 2

Group 3

Group 4

Group B

Group 5

Group 6

Group 7

Ranking of second placed teams

Second stage

Liga Departamental de Huancavelica

First stage 

FC Huayrapata advanced to the next stage as the round looser with the best record.

Second stage 
Four teams from Huaytará Province and Castrovirreyna Province entered the tournament this round.

Group A

Group B 

Source:

Third stage

Liga Departamental de Huánuco

Preliminary stage 
Both Alianza Universidad, who withdrew from the Peruvian Segunda División and León de Huánuco, relegated at the end of the 2015 Torneo Descentralizado, entered the tournament at this stage. A preliminary stage between these two teams and the champion and runner-up from Huánuco Province was played.

Source:

Bracket 

Sport La Punta did was not register properly and thus Leon de Huánuco was given the slot in the final.

Liga Departamental de Ica

First stage 

Independiente Cantayo and Los Libertadores moved on to the next stage as losers with the best record.

Second stage

Liga Departamental de Junín

First stage

Results

Second stage

Results

Play-off 

Escuela de Fútbol JTR advanced to the Group stage.

Group stage

Group A

Group B

Liga Departamental de La Libertad

First stage 
The teams were divided into five groups. Three from the Coastal Zone of the region from which the three group winners and best runner-up qualified to the next stage. The other two groups are from the Andean Zone of the region from which the best two team of each group advanced to the next stage.

Coastal Zone

Group A

Group B

Play-off

Group C

Ranking of second placed teams

Andean Zone

Group A

Group B

Second stage

Costal Zone

Andean Zone

Final group stage

Liga Departamental de Lambayeque

First stage

Group A

Group B

Second stage

Liga Departamental de Lima

First stage 

Atlético Juvenil Huaripache, Alianza Pizarro, Santo Domingo, Flamengo FBC, Somos Olímpico, Juventud Barranco, and Los Ángeles Negros move on to the next round as best runners-up.

Second stage

Liga Departamental de Loreto

First stage 
The tournament had two host cities. Nauta and Caballococha which hosted 2 groups of each.

Nauta

Group A

Group B

Caballocochas

Group A

Group B

Extra matches

Final stage

Liga Departamental de Madre de Dios

First stage

Group A

Group B

Final 

Both Deportivo Maldonado and Minsa FBC qualified to the 2017 Copa Perú National stage.

Liga Departamental de Moquegua 
AEXA Santa Cruz from General Sánchez Cerro Province was given a bye to the Second-place play-off.

First stage

Group A

Second-place play-off 

Atlético Huracán qualified as Departamental runner-up to the 2017 Copa Perú National stage.

Liga Departamental de Pasco

First stage 

Social Constitución moved on to the next round as best runner-up.

Second stage

Liga Departamental de Piura

Group stage

Group A

Tie Breaker

Group B

Group C

Group D

Group E

Second stage 

Sport Chorrillos, Sport Ingenio, and San Martín (S) moved on to the next round as best runners-up.

Third stage

Liga Departamental de Puno

First group stage

Group A

Group B

Group C

Play-off

Group D

Group E

Group F

Group G

Group H

Second group stage

Group A

Group B

Final group stage 

Because three teams were tied in points two play-off matches were played between third place and second place and between second place and first.

Play-off

2nd & 3rd-place play-off

1st & 2nd-place play-off 

Alfonso Ugarte and SIEN advance on to the National stage.

Liga Departamental de San Martín

First stage

North Zone 

Kechwas Lamistas advanced to the next round as the best runner-up.

Central Zone 

Power Maíz advanced to the next round as the best runner-up.

South Zone 

Bellavista FC advanced to the next round as the best runner-up.

Second stage

North Zone

Central Zone

South Zone

Third stage 

Saposoa FC advanced to the next round as the best runner-up.

Fourth stage

Liga Departamental de Tacna

First stage

Second stage

Liga Departamental de Tumbes

First stage

Group A

Group B

Results

Second stage

Liga Departamental de Ucayali

First stage 
La Paz from Puerto Inca Province is actually from the Huánuco Region but play in the Ucayali Region and thus received a bye to the second stage of the tournament.

Second stage

References

External links 
 DeChalaca.com – copaperu.pe la información más completa del "fútbol macho" en todo el Perú

2017
5